Macluravirus is a genus of viruses, in the family Potyviridae. Plants serve as natural hosts. There are ten species in this genus.

Description 
Similarly to other Potyviridae genera, Macluravirus  is characterised by its flexuous filamentous particles, inclusion bodies in infected plant cells and a polyprotein genome strategy.

Unlike the other genera it is transmitted by insects. It also has  shorter particles (650-660 nm in length). The genomes are monopartite. The name is derived from member species Maclura mosaic virus.

History 
The genus was proposed at the ICTV meeting in San Diego in 1998, and subsequently ratified.

Structure 
Viruses in Macluravirus are non-enveloped, with flexuous and  Filamentous geometries. The diameter is around 12-15 nm, with a length of 650-660 nm. Genomes are linear and non-segmented, bipartite, around 8.0kb in length.

Life cycle
Viral replication is cytoplasmic. Entry into the host cell is achieved by penetration into the host cell. Replication follows the positive stranded RNA virus replication model. Positive stranded RNA virus transcription is the method of transcription. The virus exits the host cell by tubule-guided viral movement.
Plants serve as the natural host. The virus is transmitted via a vector (insects). Transmission routes are vector and mechanical.

References

External links 

 Viralzone: Macluravirus
 ICTV

Potyviridae
Viral plant pathogens and diseases
Virus genera